Condé-sur-Suippe (literally Condé on Suippe) is a commune in the Aisne department in Hauts-de-France in northern France.

Geography
The river Suippe flows northwest through the northern part of the commune, then flows into the Aisne.

Population

See also
Communes of the Aisne department

References

Communes of Aisne
Remi
Aisne communes articles needing translation from French Wikipedia